Mandani Bay is a waterfront,  mixed-use development currently under construction on North Reclamation Area, Mandaue, Philippines. The development takes its name from "Mandani", an old name for Mandaue, and "Bay" from its obvious waterfront location. This project is to be developed by HTLand Inc., a joint venture by Hong Kong-based Hong Kong Land and Cebu-based Taft Properties, the real estate arm of Vicsal Development Corporation, which also owns the Metro Retail Stores Group.

History
In June 2015, Hong Kong Land and Taft Properties formally announced their intentions on developing a 20-hectare waterfront development, to be called "Mandani Bay", "Mandani" coming from Mandaue City's pre-colonial name, and "Bay" from its obvious waterfront location. Though the project was announced in the middle of 2015, ground works started as early as February 2014, when the property location was fenced. The entire property is expected to be finished within "10 to 15 years" from 2016, when the first development within the property, the Mandani Bay Suites, was launched.

See also
 Cebu Business Park
 Cebu IT Park
 South Road Properties
 The Mactan Newtown

References

External links
 Official website
 
 

Planned communities in the Philippines
Entertainment districts in the Philippines
Redeveloped ports and waterfronts in the Philippines